These 121 genera belong to the family Ptinidae, death-watch and spider beetles. There are about 100 additional genera in Ptinidae, with at least 2,200 described species. More species are listed under its subfamily Anobiinae.

Ptinidae genera

 Actenobius Fall, 1905 i c g
 Anakania Pic, 1901 g
 Anobiopsis Fall, 1905 i c g
 Anobium Fabricius, 1775 i c g
 Australanobium Español, 1976 g
 Byrrhodes LeConte, 1878 i c g
 Cacotemnus LeConte, 1861 g
 Caenocara Thomson, 1859 i c g
 Caenotylistus Sakai, 1987 g
 Calymmaderus Solier, 1849 i c g b
 Calytheca White, 1973 i c g
 Coleoaethes Philips, 1998 g
 Colposternus Fall, 1905 i c g
 Cryptopeniculus Philips, 2004 g
 Cryptorama Fall, 1905 i c g
 Cryptoramorphus White, 1966 i c g
 Ctenobium LeConte, 1865 i c g
 Deroptilinus Lea, 1924 g
 Desmatogaster Knutson, 1963 i c g
 Dignomus Wollaston, 1862 g
 Diplocotes Westwood, 1869 g
 Dorcatoma Herbst, 1792 i c g
 Dorcatomiella Blair, 1935 g
 Dryophilodes Blackburn, 1891 b
 Ectrephes Pascoe, 1866 g
 Epauloecus Mulsant & Rey, 1868 b
 Episernus Thomson, 1863 i c g
 Ernobius Thomson, 1859 i c g
 Euceratocerus LeConte, 1874 i c g
 Eucrada LeConte, 1861 i c g b
 Euvrilletta Fall, 1905 i c g
 Falsogastrallus Pic, 1914 i c g
 Gastrallanobium Wickham, 1914 g
 Gastrallus Jacquelin du Val, 1860 i c g
 Gibbium Scopoli, 1777 i c g
 Gnostus Westwood, 1855 i c g
 Hadrobregmus Thomson, 1859 i c g
 Hadrotinus White, 1973 g
 Hedobia Dejean, 1821 i c g
 Hemicoelus LeConte, 1861 i c g
 Hisamatsua Sakai, 1977 g
 Holcobius Sharp, 1881 i c g
 Homophthalmus Abeille de Perrin, 1875 g
 Hyperisus Mulsant & Rey, 1863 g
 Indanobium  g
 Kedirinus Bellés, 1991 g
 Lachnoniptus Philip, 1998 g
 Lasioderma Stephens, 1835 i c g
 Leanobium Español, 1972 g
 Megorama Fall, 1905 i c g
 Mesocoelopus Jacquelin du Val, 1860 i c g b
 Mesothes Mulsant & Rey, 1864 g
 Metholcus Jacquelin du Val, 1860 g
 Meziomorphum Pic, 1898 g
 Mezium Curtis, 1828 i c g
 Microbregma Seidlitz, 1889 i c g
 Microzogus Fall, 1905 i c g
 Mimogastrallus Sakai, 2003 g
 Mirosternus Sharp, 1881 i c g
 Mizodorcatoma Hayashi, 1955 g
 Myrmecoptinus Wasmann, 1916 g
 Neohedobia Fisher, 1919 i c g
 Neosothes White, 1967 i g
 Neoxyletobius Español & Viñolas, 1996 i c g
 Nepalanobium Sakai, 1983 g
 Nesocoelopus Español, 1977 g
 Nicobium LeConte, 1861 i c g
 Niptinus Fall, 1905 i c g
 Niptus Boieldieu, 1856 i c g
 Okamninus Mynhardt & Philips, 2013 g
 Oligomerus Redtenbacher, 1849 i c g
 Oviedinus Bellés, 2010 g
 Ozognathus LeConte, 1861 i c g
 Paralobium Fall, 1905 i c g
 Parobius White, 1966 g
 Paroligomerus Logvinovskij, 1979 g
 Petalanobium Pic, 1922 g
 Petalium LeConte, 1861 i c g b
 Pitnus Gorham, 1883 i c g
 Platybregmus Fisher, 1934 i c g
 Pocapharaptinus Philips & Akotsen, 2009 g
 Priartobium Reitter, 1901 g
 Priobium Motschulsky, 1845 i c g
 Protheca LeConte, 1865 i c g
 Pseudeurostus Heyden, 1906 i c g
 Pseudodorcatoma Pic, 1905 g
 Pseudodryophilus Heyden, 1891 g
 Ptilineurus Reitter, 1902 i c g
 Ptilinobium White, 1976 i c g
 Ptilinus Mueller, 1764 i c g b  (death-watch beetles)
 Ptinomorphus Mulsant & Rey, 1868 g b
 Ptinus Linnaeus, 1766 i c g
 Sculptotheca Schilsky, 1900 i c g
 Serianotus Ford, 1970 g
 Sphaericus Wollaston, 1854 i c g
 Stagetodes Español, 1970 g
 Stagetomorphus Pic, 1914 g
 Stagetus Wollaston, 1861 i c g
 Stegobium Motschulsky, 1860 i c g
 Stichtoptychus Fall, 1905 i c g
 Striatheca White, 1973 i c g
 Stromatanobium Viñolas, 2014 g
 Sucinoptinus Bellés, 2007 g
 Sulcoptinus Bellés, 1988 g
 Tipnus Thomson, 1863 i c g
 Trichobiopsis White, 1973 g
 Trichodesma LeConte, 1861 i c g
 Tricorynus Waterhouse, 1849 i c g
 Trigonogenius Solier, 1849 i g
 Trymolophus Bellés, 1990 g
 Utobium Fall, 1905 i c g
 Venablesia Britton, 1960 g
 Vrilletta LeConte, 1874 i c g
 Xarifa Fall, 1905 i c g
 Xenocotylus Whorrall & Philips, 2020
 Xeranobium Fall, 1905 i c g
 Xestobium Motschulsky, 1845 i c g
 Xyletinites Heyden, 1866 g
 Xyletinus Latreille, 1809 i c g
 Xyletobius Sharp, 1881 i c g
 Xyletomerus Fall, 1905 i c g
 Xylodes Waterhouse, 1876 g

Data sources: i = ITIS, c = Catalogue of Life, g = GBIF, b = Bugguide.net

References